Christmastime in Larryland is the fifth album by American comedian Larry the Cable Guy. It is his second album of Christmas-themed material, following 2004's A Very Larry Christmas. It is a concept album presented in the style of a variety show Christmas special. Christmastime in Larryland was released on October 3, 2007 on Warner Bros. Records.

Track listing 
All material written by Larry the Cable Guy.
 "Introduction & Opening Monologue" – 6:41
 "Lapquest" – 0:31
 "Eulogy" – 2:59
 "Tobacco Company Choir" – 1:20
 "Plus-Sized Fashion Shorts" – 1:06
 "Nativity Scene" – 6:36
 "Farting Jingle Bells" – 0:38
 "Bobblehead Heating Dolls" – 1:06
 "Comedian Muhammad & Oscar" – 0:47
 "Holiday Carols" – 1:52
 "A Santa's Q&A" – 10:58
 "Nutcracker" – 0:34
 "Dysfunctional Family Christmas" – 3:34
 "Liberal Commie Environmental Poem" – 3:25
 "Magic O' the Mime" – 1:43
 "1-900…" – 0:58
 "The Chitmunks" – 4:06
 "Patriotic Poem" – 2:57
 "Medley of Carols" – 0:49
 "Closing Monologue" – 3:22

Charts

Weekly charts

Year-end charts

References 

Larry the Cable Guy albums
Warner Records albums
2007 Christmas albums
Christmas albums by American artists
2000s comedy albums